Cordulephya bidens is a species of dragonfly in the family Cordulephyidae, 
known as the tropical shutwing. 
It inhabits rainforest streams in northern Queensland, Australia.

Cordulephya bidens is a small to tiny, black or purplish-black dragonfly with yellowish markings. It rests with its wings folded above its body in a similar manner to a damselfly.

Gallery

See also
 List of Odonata species of Australia

References

Cordulephyidae
Odonata of Australia
Endemic fauna of Australia
Taxa named by Yngve Sjöstedt
Insects described in 1917